The Moderates is a liberal political party in Denmark founded by former Prime Minister and current Minister of Foreign Affairs Lars Løkke Rasmussen. He announced the name in a foundational speech on 5 June 2021. At the same time, he said that his main scenario was that the party would be formed after the 2021 Danish local elections. The Moderates' political position is referred to as centre to centre-right.

According to Rasmussen, it must be a centrist party that has the ambition to create "progress and change in a crossroads between a blue bloc that is tormented by value politics and a red bloc that is stuck in a past view of individual and state". The party began collecting voting declarations in June 2021. On 15 September 2021 Lars Løkke Rasmussen announced that they had received the 20,182 signatures needed to be eligible to stand in the 2022 Danish general election.

The Moderates saw a surge in popularity during campaigning for the 2022 general election, eventually ending up as the third largest party with 16 seats, as polls had suggested. They had positioned themselves as kingmakers in deciding who the next prime minister should be, but the incumbent red bloc won a majority, thus preventing the Moderates from having the decisive seats in the next government. Despite this, the Moderates entered negotiations with the Social Democrats and Venstre and successfully formed a centrist government.

Election results

Parliament

See also 
 Liberalism and radicalism in Denmark
 List of political parties in Denmark

References 

Liberal parties in Denmark
Centrist parties in Denmark
Centre-right parties in Europe
Political parties established in 2022
Moderates (Denmark) politicians